William Theopilus Jones (February 20, 1842 – October 9, 1882) was a Delegate from the Territory of Wyoming.

Born in Corydon, Indiana, Jones received a liberal schooling.
He studied law.
He was admitted to the bar in 1865 and commenced practice in Corydon, Indiana.
During the Civil War served in the Union Army as major of the Seventeenth Regiment, Indiana Volunteer Infantry.
He was appointed associate justice of the supreme court of the Territory of Wyoming in 1869.
He settled in Cheyenne, Wyoming, in 1869.

Jones was elected as a Republican a Delegate to the Forty-second Congress (March 4, 1871 – March 3, 1873).
He was an unsuccessful candidate for reelection in 1872 to the Forty-third Congress.
He resumed the practice of law in Corydon, Indiana, where he died October 9, 1882.
He was interred in Cedar Hill Cemetery.

Sources

External links
 

1842 births
1882 deaths
People of Indiana in the American Civil War
Delegates to the United States House of Representatives from Wyoming Territory
Wyoming Republicans
Union Army officers
People from Corydon, Indiana
19th-century American politicians